970 Primula (prov. designation:  or ) is a stony background asteroid from the central regions of the asteroid belt, approximately  in diameter. It was discovered on 29 November 1921, by astronomer Karl Reinmuth at the Heidelberg Observatory in southern Germany. The S-type asteroid has a short rotation period of 2.8 hours. It was named after the genus of flowering plants, Primula, which are also known as "primroses".

Orbit and classification 

Primula is a non-family asteroid of the main belt's background population when applying the hierarchical clustering method to its proper orbital elements. It orbits the Sun in the central asteroid belt at a distance of 1.9–3.3 AU once every 4 years and 1 month (1,496 days; semi-major axis of 2.56 AU). Its orbit has an eccentricity of 0.27 and an inclination of 5° with respect to the ecliptic. The body's observation arc begins with its official discovery observation at Heidelberg observatory in November 1921.

Naming 

This minor planet was named after the genus of flowering plants, Primula, also known as "primroses". These perennial herbs belong to the family Primulaceae (primrose family) and have large tufted basal leaves and variously colored flowers. The  was mentioned in The Names of the Minor Planets by Paul Herget in 1955.

Physical characteristics 

In the SMASS classification (Bus–Binzel 2000), Primula is a common stony S-type asteroid.

Rotation period 

In November 2003, a rotational lightcurve of Primula was obtained from photometric observations by Pedro Sada, Eder Canizales and Edgar Armada using a remotely controlled commercial telescope at Tenagra Observatories . Lightcurve analysis gave a well-defined, short rotation period of  hours with a brightness variation of  magnitude. Astronomer Maurice Clark at the Preston Gott Observatory confirmed the period in September 2011, measuring  hours and a somewhat higher amplitude of 

Diameter and albedo 

The Collaborative Asteroid Lightcurve Link assumes a standard albedo for a stony asteroid of 0.20 and calculates a diameter of 10.30 kilometers based on an absolute magnitude of 12.3.

References

External links 
 Lightcurve Database Query (LCDB), at www.minorplanet.info
 Dictionary of Minor Planet Names, Google books
 Asteroids and comets rotation curves, CdR – Observatoire de Genève, Raoul Behrend
 Discovery Circumstances: Numbered Minor Planets (1)-(5000) – Minor Planet Center
 
 

000970
Discoveries by Karl Wilhelm Reinmuth
Named minor planets
000970
19211129